also known as Ninja Bugeichō Momochi Sandayū  is a 1980 Japanese film directed by Norifumi Suzuki. Hiroyuki Sanada landed his first lead role in the film.

Plot
Toyotomi Hideyoshi sends Shiranui Shōgen to Iga in search of the Momochi clan's hidden gold. Momochi clan is destroyed by him. But Momochi Sandayū's child Momochi Ganmaru narrowly escapes and he goes to Ming dynasty. 10 years later, he goes back to Japan.

Cast
Hiroyuki Sanada : Momochi Takamaru
Etsuko Shiomi : Ai-Lian
Yuki Ninagawa : Otsu
Shōhei Hino : Gosuke (Ishikawa Goemon)
Katsumasa Uchida : Shiranui Gennosuke
Masashi Ishibashi : Momochi Sandayū  
Akira Hamada : Akechi Mitsuhide
Yōko Nogiwa : Chiyo
Asao Koike : Toyotomi Hideyori
Masumi Harukawa : Lady Yodo
Makoto Satō : Junka no Yatoji 
Isao Natsuyagi : Hattori Hanzō
Tetsuro Tamba : Tozawa Hakuunsai
Sonny Chiba : Shiranui Shōgen

References

External links
 

Jidaigeki films
Samurai films
Films directed by Norifumi Suzuki
Ninja films
1980s Japanese films